Attorney General Iredell may refer to:

James Iredell (1751–1799), Attorney General of North Carolina
Thomas Iredell (died 1796), Attorney General of Jamaica